Ali Kahrizi (also Romanized as ‘Alī Kahrīzī and ‘Ālī Kahrīzī) is a village in Arshaq-e Shomali Rural District, Arshaq District, Meshgin Shahr County, Ardabil Province, Iran. At the 2006 census, its population was 121, in 24 families.

References 

Tageo

Towns and villages in Meshgin Shahr County